Under A Texas Moon is a 1930 American pre-Code musical Western film photographed entirely in Technicolor. It was based on the novel Two-Gun Man (from 1929) which was written by Stewart Edward White. It was the second all-color, all-talking feature to be filmed entirely outdoors, as well as being the second Western in color and the first all-talking, all-color Western. The film features one theme song by the title of "Under A Texas Moon."

Plot
Frank Fay, as a Mexican named Don Carlos, rides into a small Texas border settlement on the Fourth of July in the early 1880s. He is accompanied by his two inseparable companions, played by Georgie Stone and George Cooper. The day is being celebrated in the style of a  Spanish fiesta. Fay challenges a rough Texan, played by Noah Beery, to a duel, only to find himself invited to undertake the dangerous task of capturing a cattle rustler who has been stealing cattle from the Lazy Y Ranch. He accepts the task on the promise of receiving $7000 in gold if he can return both the thief and the stolen cattle within 10 days.

During the next nine days, Fay spends his time making love to every pretty girl he meets, serenading many of them by singing the theme song to the film while playing his guitar, while his two companions join in the harmonizing. He lies to them all, telling each girl exactly what she wishes to hear. Throughout all this time, he does nothing towards earning his reward. On the 10th day, he captures the cattle rustler and turns up the cattle to everyone's surprise by using a simple method of which no one had thought. He rides back to Mexico with his latest conquest in his arms.

Cast 
Frank Fay as Don Carlos
Raquel Torres as Raquella
Myrna Loy as Lolita Romero
Armida as Dolores
Noah Beery as Jed Parker
Georgie Stone as Pedro
George Cooper as Philipe
Charles Sellon as José Romero
Jack Curtis as Buck Johnson
Sam Appel as Pancho Gonzalez
Tully Marshall as Gus Aldrich
Mona Maris as Lolita Roberto

Preservation
The film survives as a single nitrate Technicolor print, copied by the UCLA Film and Television Archive.

Response
New York Latinos led by Gonzalo González protested the film, characterizing it as "anti-Mexican" mainly because Frank Fay portrayed Mexicans as being liars and womanizers. Police brutalized the picketers, killing González. The murder sparked a pan-Latino protest, in which the Latino civil rights activist Luisa Moreno participated. She later told Bert Corona that the experience "motivated her to work on behalf of unifying the Spanish-speaking communities."

See also
List of early color feature films

References

External links 
 
 

1930 films
Films based on American novels
1930s color films
Films based on Western (genre) novels
Films set in the 1880s
Films set in Texas
1930s English-language films
Films directed by Michael Curtiz
1930s Western (genre) musical films
American Western (genre) musical films
Early color films
1930s American films